Yuxia Subdistrict is a subdistrict of Dingcheng District in Changde Prefecture-level City, Hunan, China. Dividing a portion of the former Wuling Town, the subdistrict was formed in 2013.

References

External links
 Official Website (Chinese / 中文)

Dingcheng District
Subdistricts of Hunan